Zeralda is a suburb of the city of Algiers in northern Algeria.

Notable people
 Mohamed Belhocine, Algerian medical scientist, professor of internal medicine and epidemiology.
 Abdelaziz Bouteflika, fifth President of Algeria (1999–2019).

References

Suburbs of Algiers
Communes of Algiers Province